Jonathan Wright may refer to:

Jonathan Wright (historian) (born 1969), British historian and author
Jonathan B. Wright (born 1986), American actor
Jonathan C. Wright (born 1966), Illinois politician and Logan County State's Attorney
Jonathan Wright (rugby league) (born 1987), Australian NRL player
Jonathan Wright (cricketer) (born 1965), English cricketer
Jonathan Wright (translator), British journalist and literary translator
Jonathan Jasper Wright (1840–1885), African American lawyer and judge in the State of South Carolina

See also
John Wright (disambiguation)